In algebra, Brahmagupta's identity says that, for given , the product of two numbers of the form  is itself a number of that form. In other words, the set of such numbers is closed under multiplication. Specifically:

Both (1) and (2) can be verified by expanding each side of the equation.  Also, (2) can be obtained from (1), or (1) from (2), by changing b to −b.

This identity holds in both the ring of integers and the ring of rational numbers, and more generally in any commutative ring.

History
The identity is a generalization of the so-called Fibonacci identity (where n=1) which is actually found in Diophantus' Arithmetica (III, 19).
That identity was rediscovered by Brahmagupta (598–668), an Indian mathematician and astronomer, who generalized it and used it in his study of what is now called Pell's equation. His Brahmasphutasiddhanta was translated from Sanskrit into Arabic by Mohammad al-Fazari, and was subsequently translated into Latin in 1126. The identity later appeared in Fibonacci's Book of Squares in 1225.

Application to Pell's equation 
In its original context, Brahmagupta applied his discovery to the solution of what was later called Pell's equation, namely x2 − Ny2 = 1. Using the identity in the form

he was able to "compose" triples (x1, y1, k1) and (x2, y2, k2) that were solutions of x2 − Ny2 = k, to generate the new triple

Not only did this give a way to generate infinitely many solutions to x2 − Ny2 = 1 starting with one solution, but also, by dividing such a composition by k1k2, integer or "nearly integer" solutions could often be obtained. The general method for solving the Pell equation given by Bhaskara II in 1150, namely the chakravala (cyclic) method, was also based on this identity.

See also
 Brahmagupta matrix
 Brahmagupta–Fibonacci identity
 Brahmagupta's interpolation formula
 Gauss composition law
 Indian mathematics
 List of Indian mathematicians

References

External links
Brahmagupta's identity at PlanetMath
Brahmagupta Identity on MathWorld
 A Collection of Algebraic Identities

Algebra
Elementary algebra
Mathematical identities
Brahmagupta